National Valley Bank, also known as United Virginia Bank, is a historic bank building located in Staunton, Virginia. It was built in 1903 and is a one-story, three bay, Beaux Arts-style building constructed of granite, brick and carved limestone.  Its design was based on the Roman Arch of Titus.  It features semi-engaged, fluted columns of the Corinthian order flanking the central entrance.  The interior features a coffered plaster ceiling. General John Echols (1823-1896) founded the bank in 1865 and served as its first president.  His son Edward Echols, who built Oakdene, served as the National Valley Bank's third president from 1905–1915.

It was added to the National Register of Historic Places in 1979.  It is located in the Beverley Historic District.

References

Bank buildings on the National Register of Historic Places in Virginia
Beaux-Arts architecture in Virginia
Commercial buildings completed in 1903
Buildings and structures in Staunton, Virginia
National Register of Historic Places in Staunton, Virginia
Individually listed contributing properties to historic districts on the National Register in Virginia